In enzymology, a methylguanidinase is an enzyme that catalyzes the chemical reaction

methylguanidine + H2O  methylamine + urea

Thus, the two substrates of this enzyme are methylguanidine and H2O, whereas its two products are methylamine and urea.

This enzyme belongs to the family of hydrolases, those acting on carbon-nitrogen bonds other than peptide bonds, specifically in linear amidines.  The systematic name of this enzyme class is methylguanidine amidinohydrolase. This enzyme is also called methylguanidine hydrolase.

References

 

EC 3.5.3
Enzymes of unknown structure